A merman is a half-man/half-fish from mythology.

Merman may also refer to:

People 
 Ethel Merman (1908–1984), American actress and singer
 Varla Jean Merman, American drag queen

Other uses 
 Mer-Man, a character from the Masters of the Universe toy line
 "The Merman", a 1938 short story by L. Sprague de Camp
 Merman (album), a 1996 album by Emilíana Torrini
 Merman (horse), a racehorse
 "Merman", a song by Tori Amos from the benefit album No Boundaries: A Benefit for the Kosovar Refugees